David Simkins is an American screenwriter and television producer. His first produced screenplay was for the film Adventures in Babysitting in 1987. He has written for and produced television shows such as Charmed, Blade: The Series, Dark Angel and Warehouse 13.

Early life and education
Simkins grew up in South Bend, Indiana. He graduated from Clay High School in 1977, where he was active in the production of the Junior Achievement-sponsored comedy series Beyond Our Control. Simkins learned the basics of television production on the series, which was broadcast locally on WNDU-TV. After graduating high school, he studied film and broadcasting at The University of Iowa, earning a bachelor's degree in 1982.

Career
He moved to Los Angeles, California, and got his first job at Sandy Howard Productions answering phones, and later reviewing and budgeting film scripts. Simkins told The South Bend Tribune, "That's where I learned how scripts were written… I learned how they came up with a budget." He later worked for a short period of time as a development executive for New World Pictures.

He has been an active writer and producer for television since his involvement with The Adventures of Brisco County, Jr. in 1993-1994. Further work includes The Dresden Files, and Human Target. His most recent work was Powers and Wu Assassins.

References

External links

American male screenwriters
American television producers
American television writers
University of Iowa alumni
Place of birth missing (living people)
Year of birth missing (living people)
Living people
American male television writers